The lex Poetelia Papiria was a law passed in Ancient Rome that abolished the contractual form of Nexum, or debt bondage. Livy dates the law in 326 BC, during the third consulship of Gaius Poetelius Libo Visolus, but 
Varro dates the law in 313 BC, during the dictatorship of Poetelius's son.

See also
Roman law
List of Roman laws

References

External links
The Roman Law Library, incl. Leges

Roman law
Debt bondage